The Peleș is a small right tributary of the river Prahova in Romania. It flows into the Prahova in Sinaia.

References

Rivers of Romania
Rivers of Prahova County